Breakfast television is a type of infotainment television program which broadcasts live in the morning.

Breakfast television may also refer to:

 Breakfast Television (TV program), a Canadian morning news and entertainment television program that debuted on CITY-DT in Toronto in 1989
 Breakfast Television Centre, the former headquarters of TV-am in Camden Town, London, which is now the headquarters of MTV Europe